Marion Elizabeth Webster-Bukovsky (née Webster; April 9, 1921 − July 6, 1985) was a Canadian-American biochemist who was the first to isolate the Vi antigen of typhoid and to determine its structure. She published extensively on the kinin–kallikrein system while at the National Heart, Lung, and Blood Institute. Webster was an advocate for women in science and served as president of the Association for Women in Science and Graduate Women in Science.

Career and research 
After graduating from Florida State University, Webster joined a team of scientists at the United States Department of Agriculture who developed DDT as an insecticide. She then joined the Walter Reed Army Institute of Research, and earned a Ph.D. at Georgetown University. Her 1950 dissertation was titled, The Purification of Vi Antigen from Salmonella Coli. Webster was the first to isolate the Vi antigen of typhoid and to determine its structure. Joining NIH’s National Heart, Lung, and Blood Institute (NHLBI) in 1958, Webster published extensively on the kinin–kallikrein system.

An advocate for women in science, Webster believed in helping other women develop their careers, so she served as president of the Association for Women in Science and Graduate Women in Science. Webster was a member of the American Chemical Society, American Association for the Advancement of Science, American Association of Clinical Chemists, American Society for Pharmacology and Experimental Therapeutics, American Physiological Society, International Society for Biochemical Pharmacology, New York Academy of Sciences, and the Society of Experimental Biology and Medicine.

Personal life 
Marion Elizabeth Webster was born in Ottawa on April 9, 1921. She married Alexis P. Bukovsky. Webster moved from Washington, D.C. to Winter Park, Florida in 1976. She was a member of the First United Methodist Church and Virginia Heights Association in Winter Park. She served as a member the Winter Park Housing Authority Commission. Webster died on July 6, 1985 in Winter Park. She was survived by her husband and brothers, Bruce S. Webster of North Fort Myers, Florida and Donald A. Webster of Ottawa. Webster was buried at Palm Cemetery in Florida.

Selected works

References

External links

1921 births
1985 deaths
20th-century American women scientists
20th-century American chemists
20th-century American biologists
American women biochemists
Scientists from Ontario
Canadian emigrants to the United States
Florida State University alumni
Georgetown University alumni
United States Department of Agriculture officials
National Institutes of Health people
Women medical researchers
American medical researchers
Canadian medical researchers
Canadian women biologists
Canadian biochemists
20th-century Canadian biologists
20th-century Canadian women scientists
20th-century Canadian chemists
Canadian women chemists